First Love is the debut Japanese-language studio album (second overall) by Japanese-American recording artist Hikaru Utada, released on March 10, 1999, by Toshiba-EMI.

An R&B and dance-pop album, First Love centres on the theme of love and relationships. Songs like "Automatic" and "First Love" are prime examples of these themes. A 2014 re-issue of the album was released simultaneously, featuring a bonus live DVD and the special edition featured two additional discs. Critics' opinions of the album were generally favourable, praising Utada's song writing and vocal delivery. In its first week of release, the album entered the Oricon Albums Chart at number one with over two million units sold. Since its release, First Love remains the highest selling Japanese album. It has sold over eleven million units worldwide.

Utada promoted the album by releasing four singles: "Automatic", "Time Will Tell", "Movin' on Without You" and "First Love", all which were accompanied by a short music video. She performed several tracks from the album on several television appearances in 1998 and 1999, and have performed songs on her Utada: In the Flesh 2010 and Wild Life tours. "Automatic", "Time Will Tell" and First Love are her best-selling singles and album respectively.

Background
Born and raised in Manhattan, New York City, Utada started singing at a very young age; she was a member of U, a musical act with her mother Keiko Fuji and her father Teruzane. U released their debut album Star in 1993, with the hope to debut in America; the album only peaked at thirty-three in Japan. Utada's mother was a Japanese enka singer and actress, while her father was a Japanese record producer who had contributed to some of Fuji's work. In 1996, the group was re-branded as Cubic U, an R&B project that focused primarily on Hikaru, resulting in the English language album Precious in 1998 with record label Toshiba EMI. The album peaked at two on the Oricon Albums Chart and sold over 700,000 units.

Utada moved to Tokyo in early 1997 to attend Seisen International School and American School in Japan. During her studies, Utada signed as a solo artist with Toshiba EMI and begun recording her album First Love. Fluent in both English and Japanese languages, the head offices at EMI asked if she could write Japanese songs rather than English lyrics. During the process of the album, Utada desired to become a singer-songwriter and occasionally practised producing and composing her music rather than become a Japanese idol. She refused to allow talent agencies to contact her at the start, which was a very common tradition for Japanese singers in the 1990s, and her father started to manage her work along with producing and composing it; to this day, her father continues to manage and co-produce some of their work.

Composition

The lyrics to the tracks from First Love are written by Utada and featured English-language phrases. Utada's father Teruzane and Akira Miyake served as the album's primary producers alongside Hikaru; Saito Masaaki, Nakasone Junya, Sanada Yoshiaki and Okamoto Tatsyua served as the album's executive producers. Utada contributed to editing and producing her recorded vocals for all the tracks. The tracks from First Love were recorded in studios across her native New York City, Los Angeles and Tokyo. American producer and mixer Ted Jensen had mixed the tracks at Sterling Sound Studios in New York.

The album's opener "Automatic" is a R&B and dance-pop song that talks about a previous relationship. Rockin' On Japan'''s editor and chief Kano had commented that Utada had brought a large prominence of R&B and soul music with the tracks "Automatic" and "Time Will Tell", and felt that "Automatic"'s release introduced a new R&B audience inside of Japan. The title track is a pop ballad song conveying slow and off-key vocals that complimented the music to the album.

"Movin' on Without You" is a disco and house inspired track that was influenced by the early 1990s dance music throughout the Western part of the world and lasts a duration total off four minutes and forty-one seconds. "B&C", a funk song, was featured as a b-side to the physical CD format from "Movin' on Without You". The album closer "Give Me a Reason" is a trip hop song. "Interlude" was produced into a song called "Kotoba ni Naranai Kimochi" on Utada's Distance album.

ReleaseFirst Love was released on March 10, 1999, by Toshiba EMI. The album was released as a compact disc and a double vinyl. The vinyl was exclusively released in North America and Japan by Eastworld Records. First Love was released in the Philippines by OctoArts EMI Music. It was released in South Korea by Eastworld and Indonesia by Toshiba EMI Limited and PT EMI Indonesia.

After fifteen years of its release, First Love was re-released by Universal Music Japan on March 10, 2014, in two separate versions. The normal version is a two-disc set featuring a remastered version of the normal album along with a second disc featuring Utada's previously unreleased "LUV LIVE" concert. The remastering was done by Ted Jensen. The other version is a limited edition 4-disc set, containing the remastered track list on disc one, "LUV LIVE" concert on disc two, as well as featuring a disc containing karaoke tracks and the last containing a multitude of demos from the First Love era of Utada's career. The deluxe edition also carries with it memorabilia from that time, including a hard cover booklet filled with unreleased photoshoots, handwritten lyrics, promotional items as well as replicas of the tickets and backstage passes to her "LUV LIVE" concert. The Deluxe Edition initially was limited to 5,000 copies, however, due to overwhelming demand, this was pushed to 10,000 after the initial 5,000 units were sold almost instantly.

Singles
The A-side singles "Automatic" and "Time Will Tell' was released on 9 December 1998 as 8cm CD singles. The songs received positive reviews, many which were highlighted as album stand outs. "Automatic" was given the gold award at the 2000 JASRAC awards, beating her own song "Time Will Tell" and "Dango 3 Kyodai" to be the most royalty-receiving song in 1999. The Japan Record Awards mentioned the song as an Honorable Mention Award. In 2000, The Japan Gold Disc Awards had awarded "Automatic" along with "Movin' on Without You" and "Addicted to You" for Song(s) of the Year. "Automatic/Time Will Tell" peaked at number two and four on the Oricon Singles Chart in their respective formats. "Automatic/Time Will Tell" has sold over 2.1 million units in Japan, making it her best selling physical single and the nineteenth best selling single in Japan.

The third single "Movin' on Without You" was released on February 17, 1999, as a CD single. The song received positive reviews, many of which highlighted the song as an album stand out. It won the award for Song of the Year at the Japan Gold Disks Awards. The song reached number one on the Oricon Singles Chart, marking this her first number one. The song was certified million by the Recording Industry Association of Japan (RIAJ) for shipments of one million units. The fourth and final single "First Love" was released on April 28, 1999, as a mini-CD single. The song received positive reviews, many of which highlighted the song as an album stand out. The song peaked at number two on the Oricon Singles Chart, missing the top spot but was certified double platinum by RIAJ for shipments of 800,000 units in Japan.

Commercial performanceFirst Love entered the Oricon Albums Chart at number one with over two million units sold. It stayed at number one for six weeks and stayed on the chart for eighty-four weeks. By August 2000, First Love had sold 9.6million units in Asia, including 8.7million in Japan, 450,000 in Taiwan, and another 450,000 in other Asian countries. First Love is the only album or physical record to have been certified 8x Million by RIAJ, which is equivalent to 32x platinum. This makes First Love the best selling Japanese and Asian-oriented album of all time. As of March 2010, First Love has sold over ten million units worldwide. In September 2007, Rolling Stone Japan ranked First Love No.99 on its list of the "100 Greatest Japanese Rock Albums of All Time". First Love is the seventh album to claim the highest weekly sales in Japan, behind her 2001 album Distance and 2002 album Deep River''.

Track listing

Personnel
All Japanese names are in Western order – given name before family name.

Hikaru Utada – vocals
Anthony Jimenez Corton – secret Love, additional chorus
Akira Nishihira – arrangement, keyboards & programming
Kei Kawano – arrangement, additional keyboards
Shinichiro Murayama – arrangement, keyboards & programming
Toshiyuki Mori – arrangement, keyboards & programming
Jun Isomura – arrangement
Tsuyoshi Kon – guitar
Yoshiaki Kusaka – guitar
Hironori Akiyama – guitar
Yuji Toriyama – guitar
Masayoshi Furukawa – guitar
Yuichiro Honda – guitar
Yuichiro Goto – strings
Jullian Hernandez – additional chorus
Nobuhiko Nakayama – synthesizer programming
Takahiro Iida – synthesizer programming
Masayuki Momo – synthesizer programming
Taka & Speedy – rhythm arrangement, rhythm programming
Akira Miyake – producer
Teruzane Sking Utada – producer
Hidenobu Okita – director
Masaaki Ugajin – all vocals' recording
Masaaki Ugajin, Masashi Kudo, Seiji Motoyama, Takehiko Kamata, Bob Allecca, Mike Brown – back track recording
Hotoda Goh – mixing
Ted Jensen – mastering

Charts

Weekly charts

Year-end charts

Certifications and sales

Notes

See also
 List of best-selling albums by women
 List of best-selling albums in Japan
 List of best-selling albums in Taiwan

References

Hikaru Utada albums
1999 debut albums
Japanese-language albums
Universal Music Japan albums